Anatoma rhynchodentata is a species of minute sea snail, a marine gastropod mollusc or micromollusc in the family Anatomidae.

References

External links
 To World Register of Marine Species

Anatomidae
Gastropods described in 2012